Sergent may refer to:

Places
Sergent, Kentucky

People
Annette Sergent
Bernard Sergent (born 1946), French ancient historian and comparative mythologist
Brian Sergent
Brian Sergent (footballer)
Harold Sergent
Jesse Sergent
Lucien-Pierre Sergent (1849–1904), French academic painter
Michel Sergent (born 1943), French politician 
René Sergent (1865–1927), French architect
Stéphane Sergent (born 1973), French footballer

See also
Sergeant (disambiguation)